Redondo Beach station is an elevated light rail station on the C Line of the Los Angeles Metro Rail system. It is located over Marine Avenue in the city of Redondo Beach, California, after which the station is named. It is currently the western terminus of the C Line.

The original name for the station was Marine Ave / Redondo Beach Ave, until 2005 when the station was renamed Redondo Beach.

An extension beyond Redondo Beach into Torrance is in the planning stages. The train platform, currently suitable for two-car trains, may be lengthened to accommodate three-car trains to enable increased capacity of the line.

Service

Station layout

Hours and frequency

Connections 
, the following connections are available:
 Beach Cities Transit: 102
 GTrans: 1X

 LADOT Commuter Express:  (select trips), 
 Los Angeles Metro Bus:

In popular culture 
The station appeared as the light rail station in the opening montage to the 1995 film Heat. The station also appeared in the closing moments of another film directed by Michael Mann, Collateral.

References 

C Line (Los Angeles Metro) stations
Railway stations in the United States opened in 1995
Redondo Beach, California
1995 establishments in California